xALBUMx is the debut studio album by Eatmewhileimhot. It was released digitally on July 27, 2010. 300 physical editions were released through a preorder. This is the first and last album that Caleb Denison is featured on.

Despite receiving mostly negative reviews, the album reached No. 46 on the 'Billboard Heatseeker Albums chart.

Singles
Two of the singles had different names when released. The songs were later renamed to go with the album's theme. "xVAMPIRESx" was "Vampiresliveinmybrain", "xBURRITOx" was "xXBurritoXx", and "xSMWHOREx" was "xXSmoreKillaXx".

Track listing

Personnel
Eatmewhileimhot
Christofer Drew Ingle – vocals, programming
Taylor MacFee – bass
Hayden Kaiser – guitar
Caleb Denison - drums

Charts

References

2010 debut albums
Eat Me Raw albums